The first USS Flicker (AM-70) was a minesweeper in the United States Navy during World War II, named after the flicker, a medium-sized member of the woodpecker family common to North America.

Laid down on 27 October 1936 as the steel-hulled  fishing trawler, M/V Delaware by the Bath Iron Works, Bath, Maine for the Booth Fisheries Co. of Boston, Massachusetts, the ship was launched on 25 February 1937.
 
Acquired by the US Navy on 9 August 1940 and converted to a minesweeper at the Bethlehem Steel Co., East Boston, she was renamed Flicker on 14 August 1940, and commissioned as USS Flicker (AM-70) on 26 October 1940. Conversion was completed on 26 March 1941. She was reclassified IX-165 on 11 April 1944.

World War II North Atlantic operations 
After training off Norfolk, Virginia, Flicker carried out sweeping operations off Bermuda from May 1941 through December, then returned to Norfolk for minesweeping in the Virginia Capes.

South Atlantic operations
On 19 September 1942, she arrived at Recife, Brazil, where she served as harbor entrance guard ship and swept mines until 7 January 1943. Her base from that time to 11 July was Bahia, Brazil, and after operations at Rio de Janeiro, she returned to Bahia on 21 November, to serve there until 8 February 1944.

Return to the North Atlantic 
Flicker arrived at Norfolk, Virginia, on 6 March, and after repairs, sailed for Argentia, Newfoundland, arriving on 1 June. She carried cargo to ports in Labrador, Nova Scotia, and Newfoundland, once sailing south to reload at Boston, Massachusetts, and patrolled off Argentia, until returning to Boston on 11 November.

Decommissioning 
She was decommissioned on 3 January 1945, and transferred to the Maritime Commission on 31 March 1945.

References

External links
 

Ships built in Bath, Maine
1937 ships
Minesweepers of the United States Navy
World War II mine warfare vessels of the United States